The Becket Casket is a reliquary in Limoges enamel now in the Victoria and Albert Museum.  It is made of gilt-copper round a wooden core, decorated with champlevé enamel, and of a shape called a "chasse".  It was made in about 1180–90 in Limoges, France, and depicts one of the most infamous events in English history. On the night of 29 December 1170, Archbishop Thomas Becket was murdered in Canterbury cathedral by four knights obeying the wishes of King Henry II. It provoked outrage throughout Europe, and pilgrims flocked to Canterbury to pray at the site of the murder. In 1173 Becket was canonized and his shrine was one of the most famous in the Christian world, until its total destruction in 1538 during the reign of Henry VIII.  It is thought that this particular casket was made to hold the relics of Thomas Becket that were taken to Peterborough Abbey (now Peterborough Cathedral) by Abbot Benedict in 1177.  Benedict had been Prior at Canterbury Cathedral and therefore saw Becket's assassination. 

Relics of St Thomas were widely dispersed in the years following his death. Many were placed in caskets made in Limoges enamel in south-west France. This was the centre for the production of objects in champlevé enamel, which is characterized by brilliant blues, colourful rosettes and boldly engraved figures. This casket is the most elaborate, the largest and possibly the earliest in date, but over 45 medieval chasses survive showing Becket's story and thought to have been made in Limoges.  Another fine example is in the Burrell Collection in Glasgow.   

The scene of the martyrdom is shown on the front, where one of the knights decapitates Becket in front of the altar, while on the sloping roof the archbishop's funeral is depicted. On the back are four saints and at the one end Christ is seated on a rainbow. The other end, which may have shown St Peter, is missing, as is the floor of the casket and its contents.

Notes

References
Binski, Paul in: Jonathan Alexander & Paul Binski (eds), Age of Chivalry, Art in Plantagenet England, 1200–1400, Royal Academy/Weidenfeld & Nicolson, London 1987
Jackson, Anna (ed.) V&A: A Hundred Highlights (V&A Publications, 2001)

External links
The Becket Casket at the Victoria and Albert Museum
1180s works
1190s works
Collections of the Victoria and Albert Museum
Christian reliquaries
Romanesque art
Works in vitreous enamel
Medieval European metalwork objects
Thomas Becket